3faltig is an Austrian-German comedy film directed by Harald Sicheritz. It was released in 2010.

External links
 

2010 films
2010s German-language films
Austrian comedy films
German comedy films
2010 comedy films
2010s German films
Portrayals of Jesus in film